The Jesse Mount House, also known as the Champion–McAlpin House, is a home in Savannah, Georgia, United States. It is located at 122–124 West Jones Street and was constructed in 1852.

Built for Jesse Mount, a wing was added in 1857. It was owned by a Mrs. Maria McAlpin from 1859 to 1888. Maria's father, Aaron Champion, lived at the Harper Fowlkes House, at 230 Barnard Street, from 1843. Improvements totaling $9,000 were made in 1861.

The building is part of the Savannah Historic District. 
In a survey for the Historic Savannah Foundation, Mary Lane Morrison found the building to be of significant status.

See also
Buildings in Savannah Historic District

References

Houses in Savannah, Georgia
Houses completed in 1852
Savannah Historic District